The Embassy of the Republic of Indonesia in London is the diplomatic mission of Indonesia in the United Kingdom and concurrently accredited to the Republic of Ireland. From shortly after independence until the end of February 2017, the embassy was located at 38 Grosvenor Square, a leasehold building in Mayfair, close to the (now former) location of the American embassy.

On 1 March 2017, the embassy moved to 30 Great Peter Street in Westminster, a 60,000 square foot freehold building purchased by Indonesia for £40 million.

History

The first diplomatic representative of Indonesia in the United Kingdom was Dr. Subandrio, who served from 1949 until 1954. There have been 20 ambassadors over the years, including two air marshals, a lieutenant and Marty Natalegawa, who later served as the Minister of Foreign Affairs of Indonesia.

There are currently 10 departments in the embassy, including 2 Defence Attachés, 1 Transportation Attaché, 1 Trade Attaché and 1 Educational Attaché.

Gallery

See also
 Indonesia-United Kingdom relations
 List of diplomatic missions of Indonesia
 List of ambassadors of Indonesia to the United Kingdom

References

External links
Official website

Indonesia
London
Indonesia–United Kingdom relations